Iskay Wasi (Quechua iskay two, wasi house, "two houses", also spelled Iscay Huasi) is a mountain in the Bolivian Andes which reaches a height of approximately . It is located in the Cochabamba Department, at the border of the Arani Province, Vacas Municipality, and the Carrasco Province, Pocona Municipality. Iskay Wasi lies northeast of Qucha Quchayuq Urqu. The Iskay Wasi Mayu originates at the mountain. It flows to Misk'i Mayu.

References 

Mountains of Cochabamba Department